Life Line is an album by the George Adams-Don Pullen Quartet recorded in 1981 for the Dutch Timeless label.

Reception
The Allmusic review by Steve Loewy awarded the album 4 stars stating "There is some sensational music throughout, but the listener is left with a sense that this is not all that it could have been... While not the best effort by the quartet, it is one with plenty of rewarding moments".

Track listing
All compositions by Don Pullen except as indicated
 "The Great Escape or Run John Henry Run" – 4:42 
 "Seriously Speaking" (George Adams) – 8:02 
 "Soft Seas" (Dannie Richmond) – 7:20 
 "Nature's Children" (Adams) – 9:48 
 "Protection" (Adams) – 1:35 
 "Newcomer; Seven Years Later" – 9:34 
Recorded at Fendal Sound Recording Studio in Loenen Aan de Vecht, Holland on April 5 & 6, 1981

Personnel
Don Pullen – piano
George Adams – tenor saxophone, flute, vocals
Cameron Brown – bass
Dannie Richmond – drums

References

Timeless Records albums
Don Pullen albums
George Adams (musician) albums
1981 albums